Mengwi is a district (kecamatan) in the Badung Regency, Bali, Indonesia and also covers Bali's heaviest tourist regions, situated to the north of Kuta District and North Kuta District (including Seminyak), and including Canggu. It covers an area of 82.0 km2 and had a population of 122,829 at the 2010 Census and 132,786 at the 2020 Census.

The Mengwi village itself is located almost halfway between Ubud and Bali’s southwest coast, located just slightly closer to Ubud. The majority of visitors to the village have come from more tourist-centric areas of the island are just passing through for a chance to experience a traditional Balinese village.

References

Populated places in Bali
Districts of Bali
Badung Regency